Willis Building may refer to:

Willis Building (London), a skyscraper in London
Willis Building, Ipswich, a low-rise office building in Ipswich, Suffolk
Willis Tower a skyscraper in Chicago formerly called the Sears Tower